Gastón Cibert (20 October 1917 – 1989) was an Argentine sailor. He competed in the Swallow event at the 1948 Summer Olympics.

References

External links
 

1917 births
1989 deaths
Argentine male sailors (sport)
Olympic sailors of Argentina
Sailors at the 1948 Summer Olympics – Swallow
Sportspeople from Buenos Aires